Ali Dino, also known as Ali Dino Bey (1890–1938) was an Albanian cartoonist and a Member of the Greek Parliament.

Biography
Dino was born in Chios, in the Vilayet of the Archipelago of the Ottoman Empire in 1890, to Rasih Dino. He was grandson of Abedin Dino, one of the main contributors of the Albanian independence. He became one of the most famous cartoonists in Greece, and was elected in the Greek Parliament for the Preveza prefecture in 1915. Dino later founded the Party of the Chameria, that represented the local Cham Albanian community as well as of the Greek Albanian Friendship Society. He died in Athens, Greece, in 1938.

Works

References

1890 births
1938 deaths
Politicians from Chios
People from Janina vilayet
Cham Albanians
Greek cartoonists
Ali
Greek politicians
People from Preveza
Greek MPs 1915–1917